Fay Jones (born 1936, birth name Fay Bailey) is an American artist, based in Seattle, Washington. A large number of her works are exhibited in public places in the Pacific Northwest, including a mural in the Westlake Station of the Downtown Seattle Transit Tunnel and a painting in Seattle's opera house, McCaw Hall. A 1986 retrospective organized  by the Boise Art Museum also showed at the Seattle Art Museum.

Early life
In 1953, she graduated from high school and enrolled in the Rhode Island School of Design (RISD). In 1956, she met RISD drawing instructor Robert C. Jones (b. 1930); they married the following year, and moved to Seattle in 1960, where Robert Jones became a member of the art faculty of the University of Washington. They had four children, born between 1958 and 1966.

Career
She had her first exhibit in 1970 at the Francine Seders Gallery in Seattle. In the mid-1980s, she was selected, along with Roger Shimomura and Gene Gentry McMahon to design major murals for the Westlake Station of the new Downtown Seattle Transit Tunnel. A 1996 retrospective organized  by the Boise Art Museum also showed at the Seattle Art Museum and at the Washington State University Museum of Art in Pullman, Washington.

She illustrated one card (Stasis) for the debut set of the soon-to-be-famous Magic: The Gathering trading card game as a favor for her nephew, the game's designer Richard Garfield.

In 2006, Jones and her husband had a joint show at the Casa Museo Gene Byron in Guanajuato. They maintain a primary residence in West Seattle.

Her work is included in the permanent collection of the Seattle Art Museum.

Awards
2013 - Joan Mitchell Painters and Sculptors grant
2006 - Seattle Art Museum’s Poncho Artist of the Year award
1983 and 1990 - grants from the NEA
1984 - Washington State Arts Commission
1989 - La Napoli Art Foundation

Notes

1936 births
Living people
20th-century American painters
21st-century American painters
American watercolorists
Artists from Boston
Artists from Washington (state)
Painters from Washington (state)
Artists from Seattle
20th-century American printmakers
American women painters
20th-century American women artists
21st-century American women artists
Women watercolorists
American women printmakers